Walter Leschetizky is an Austrian former ice dancer. During his partnership with Elfriede Rupp, he won two national titles and placed 16th at the 1969 European Championships. Competing with Brigitte Scheijbal, he became a three-time national champion. They competed at two European and two World Championships in the 1970s. The duo belonged to Wiener Eislauf-Verein in Vienna.

Leschetizky has worked as an International Skating Union judge and international referee. As of 2017, he is the president of Wiener Eislauf-Verein.

Competitive highlights

With Scheijbal

With Rupp

References 

20th-century births
Austrian male ice dancers
Figure skating judges
Living people
Figure skaters from Vienna
Year of birth missing (living people)